Groves Point is a community in the Canadian province of Nova Scotia, located in the Cape Breton Regional Municipality.

Demographics 

Parks
Groves Point Provincial Park, is a Day-use park featuring a sand and pebble beach and the warm salt water of the Bras d'Or Lake. The parks features change houses for beach goers. Visitors can picnic in the field or at tables under a softwood stand.

The park is open for day use (from dawn to dusk), from May 15 to October 12. There is no charge for using the park and its facilities.

References

Communities in the Cape Breton Regional Municipality
Designated places in Nova Scotia
General Service Areas in Nova Scotia